Marc-Antoine Blais Bélanger (born February 20, 1995) is a Canadian fencer in the épée discipline. Blais Bélanger has competed internationally for Canada since 2013.

Career

Olympics
Blais Bélanger represented Canada at the 2020 Summer Olympics, after winning the individual men's épée competition at the Pan American Zonal Qualifier in San José, Costa Rica.

See also
List of Canadian sports personalities

References

External links
 

1995 births
Living people

Canadian male fencers

Fencers at the 2019 Pan American Games
Sportspeople from Montreal
Pan American Games competitors for Canada
Fencers at the 2020 Summer Olympics
Olympic fencers of Canada